Thomas Christopher Beadling (born 16 January 1996) is a professional footballer who plays as a midfielder for Western Sydney Wanderers. Beadling can also play as a defender.

Born in Barrow, Beadling spent several years in Australia before joining Sunderland's Academy. In 2017, he was loaned to Bury, where he made his professional debut, and the following year he spent half a season on loan with Dunfermline Athletic. After a successful spell in Scotland, Beadling joined Dunfermline on a permanent deal.

Beadling has been involved with Australia's youth teams in the past.

Early life
Beadling was born in Barrow, England.

Club career

Sunderland
Beadling joined Sunderland as an eight-year old and remained linked with the club throughout his youth.

As a teenager Beadling spent time in Western Australia where he played with the National Training Centre. In mid-2009 he represented Australia at the Under-13 Festival of Football tournament in Malaysia.

A family move back to England the following year saw Beadling re-enter the Sunderland academy. He captained the club's Under-23s and featured in the first team for their tour of North America in 2015.

In January 2017, Beadling moved to League One side Bury on loan until the end of the 2016–17 season.

A year later, Beadling was again sent out on loan, this time to Scottish Championship club Dunfermline Athletic.

Dunfermline Athletic
After a successful spell with the Pars, during which time he helped the club finish in the final Scottish Premiership play-off spot, Beadling signed a two-year pre-contract deal with Dunfermline, following the end of his contract with Sunderland. On the same day Beadling was announced to have officially signed with Dunfermline, Sunderland's new ownership expressed their dismay at the player leaving. Beadling was released by the club in May 2020 following the end of his contract.

Barrow
On 20 July 2020, Beadling signed for  his hometown club, Barrow, who were newly promoted to League Two. He was released following the end of his contract in May 2022.

Western Sydney Wanderers
In July 2022, Beading returned to Australia to sign for A-League Men side Western Sydney Wanderers.

International career
In 2009, Beadling was selected as part of an Australian under-13 national representative side. In 2013, he was selected for an Australia under-20 camp in London.

Career statistics

References

External links

1996 births
Living people
Footballers from Barrow-in-Furness
Association football defenders
English footballers
Australian soccer players
Australia youth international soccer players
Sunderland A.F.C. players
Bury F.C. players
Dunfermline Athletic F.C. players
Barrow A.F.C. players
Western Sydney Wanderers FC players
English Football League players
Scottish Professional Football League players
Footballers from Cumbria